James Thomas Walsh (July 10, 1894 – May 13, 1967) was a Major League Baseball pitcher who played in  with the Detroit Tigers. He batted and threw left-handed.

He was born in Roxbury, Massachusetts, and died in Boston, Massachusetts.

External links

1894 births
1967 deaths
Major League Baseball pitchers
Baseball players from Massachusetts
Detroit Tigers players
Burials in Boston
Elmira Colonels players
Louisville Colonels players
Scranton Miners players
Minor league baseball managers